The Los Angeles Film Critics Association Award for Best Animated Feature is one of the annual awards given by the Los Angeles Film Critics Association.

History
This award had been given since 1989 and between 2001 and present it helps with the nominations for the Academy Award for Best Animated Feature.

Winners

1980s

1990s

2000s

2010s

2020s

References

Los Angeles Film Critics Association Awards
Awards for best animated feature film
Awards established in 1989